Capital Airlines Flight 67 was a domestic scheduled U.S. passenger flight operated by Capital Airlines which crashed on final approach to Freeland, Michigan, during a severe snowstorm on April 6, 1958, killing all 47 people on board. The flight was en route from Flint-Bishop Airport to the Freeland-Tri City Airport (now MBS International Airport) when it crashed. Flight 67 was the first of four fatal crashes in the space of two years involving Capital Airlines Vickers Viscounts; the others were Capital Airlines Flight 300 (May 1958), Capital Airlines Flight 75 (May 1959), and Capital Airlines Flight 20 (January 1960).

Approach conditions towards Freeland were poor due to the weather; there was restricted visibility, and conditions were ripe for icing. The plane's crew apparently attempted a steep turn to align the craft with the runway.  This caused the plane to stall, which was followed by a spin.  The crew could not regain control, leading to the crash.

The official cause of the crash was listed as an undetected buildup of ice on the horizontal stabilizer which, coupled with airspeed and the design of the aircraft, caused it to lose control. Furthermore, the aircraft's stall warning device was inoperative.

A memorial to the victims was unveiled in a local cemetery in 2001.

References

External links
 
 
 

Aviation accidents and incidents in the United States in 1958
67
1958 meteorology
1958 in Michigan
Airliner accidents and incidents caused by ice
Airliner accidents and incidents in Michigan
Disasters in Michigan
Accidents and incidents involving the Vickers Viscount
Saginaw Bay
April 1958 events in the United States